Harvey Mabry Jones (April 15, 1921 – December 13, 1998) was an American football halfback and defensive back in the National Football League for the Cleveland Rams and the Washington Redskins.  He played college football at Baylor University.

1921 births
1998 deaths
People from Beaumont, Texas
American football defensive backs
American football running backs
Baylor Bears football players
Cleveland Rams players
Washington Redskins players